Venmanad is a census town in Thrissur district in the Indian state of Kerala.

Demographics
 India census, Venmanad had a population of 9687. Males constitute 48% of the population and females 52%. Venmanad has an average literacy rate of 86%, higher than the national average of 59.5%: male literacy is 87%, and female literacy is 85%. In Venmanad, 11% of the population is under 6 years of age.

References

Cities and towns in Thrissur district